Events from the year 1925 in France.

Incumbents
President: Gaston Doumergue 
President of the Council of Ministers: 
 until 17 April: Édouard Herriot
 17 April-28 November: Paul Painlevé
 starting 28 November: Aristide Briand

Events
21 May – 25 October International Exhibition of Hydropower and Tourism in Grenoble.
25 August – Occupation of the Ruhr ends with the evacuation of the last French troops.
Cookware manufacturer Le Creuset established in Fresnoy-le-Grand.
Ybry, a French luxury perfume and fashion house is founded.

Sport
21 June – Tour de France begins.
19 July – Tour de France ends, won by Ottavio Bottecchia of Italy.

Births

January to March
1 January – Raymond Pellegrin, actor (died 2007)
6 January – Joseph-André Motte, furniture designer (died 2013)
7 January – Pierre Gripari, writer (died 1990)
18 January – Gilles Deleuze, philosopher (died 1995)
2 February – Marcela Delpastre, author (died 1998)
13 February – René Pleimelding, soccer player (died 1998)
16 February – François-Xavier Ortoli, politician, businessman, Minister and President of the European Commission (died 2007)
4 March – Paul Mauriat, musical director (died 2006)
12 March – Louison Bobet, cyclist, three times Tour de France winner (died 1983)
12 March – Georges Delerue, film composer (died 1992)
21 March – Max Varnel, film and television director (died 1996)
26 March – Pierre Boulez, composer and conductor (died 2016)

April to June
10 April – Bernard Moitessier, yachtsman and author (died 1994)
27 April – François Châtelet, historian of philosophy (died 1985)
30 April – Corinne Calvet, actress (died 2001)
3 May – Jean Séguy, sociologist of religions (died 2007)
17 May 
Michel de Certeau, Jesuit and scholar (died 1986)
Claude Julien, journalist and editor (died 2005)
25 May – Claude Pinoteau, film director and scriptwriter (died 2012)
27 May – Jean-Paul Aron, writer and journalist (died 1988)
8 June – Claude Estier, politician and journalist (died 2016)
14 June – Jean-Louis Rosier, racing driver (died 2011)
25 June – Charles Ceccaldi-Raynaud, lawyer and politician (died 2019)
26 June – Jean Frydman, French resistant and businessman (died 2021)

July to September
3 July – Roger Chesneau, steeplechaser
8 July 
Jean Cau, writer and journalist (died 1993)
Dominique Nohain, actor, dramatist and director (died 2017)
11 July – Jules Henri Saiset, existentialist philosopher, dramatist, novelist, and critic (died 1995)
14 July – Gaston Rousseau, racing cyclist (died 2019)
19 July 
Henri Beaujean, politician (died 2021)
Jean-Pierre Faye, philosopher, poet, and writer 
6 August – Guy Degrenne, French businessman (died 2006)
6 August – Lilyan Chauvin, actress and writer (died 2008)
21 August – Maurice Pialat, film director, screenwriter and actor (died 2003)
26 August – Alain Peyrefitte, scholar and politician (died 1999)
27 August – Darry Cowl, musician and actor (died 2006)
30 August – Laurent de Brunhoff, author and illustrator

October to December
3 October – Simone Segouin, Resistance fighter (died 2023)
13 October – Armand Mouyal, epee fencer (died 1988)
31 October -
Roger Nimier, novelist (died 1962)
Franck Ténot, press agent, pataphysician and jazz critic (died 2004)
24 November – André Lévy, sinologist (died 2017)
27 November – Claude Lanzmann, documentary filmmaker and philosopher (died 2018)
2 December – Jacques Lacarrière, writer, critic, journalist, and essayist (died 2005)
5 December – Henri Oreiller, alpine skier and Olympic gold medallist (died 1962)
7 December – Hermano da Silva Ramos, French-Brazilian Formula One driver
23 December – Pierre Bérégovoy, politician and Prime Minister (died 1993)
26 December – Claude Meillassoux, economic anthropologist and Africanist (died 2005)

Full date unknown
Roger Giroux, poet (died 1974)
Claude Tresmontant, philosopher, hellenist and theologian (died 1997)

Deaths

January to June
29 January – Charles-Eusèbe Dionne, naturalist and taxidermist (born 1846)
10 February – Aristide Bruant, singer, comedian and nightclub owner (born 1851)
14 February – Jacques Rivière, man of letters (born 1886; typhoid)
25 February – Louis Feuillade, film director (born 1873)
4 March – Roger de Barbarin, trap shooter (born 1860)
5 March
Clément Ader, engineer and aviation pioneer (born 1841)
Michel Verne, writer (born 1861)
19 March – Firmin Bouisset, poster artist (born 1859)
22 April – André Caplet, composer and conductor (born 1878)
3 May – Louis Delaporte, explorer and artist (born 1842)
12 May
Léonce Bénédite, art historian and curator (born 1856)
Charles Mangin, general during World War I (born 1866)
1 June – Lucien Guitry, actor (born 1860)
6 June – Pierre Louÿs, poet (born 1870)
13 June – Paul Teste, aviator (born 1892; air crash)

July to December
1 July – Erik Satie, composer and pianist (born 1866)
5 August – Georges Palante, philosopher and sociologist (born 1862)
12 August – Leon Dehon, clergyman (born 1843)
7 September – René Viviani, politician, Prime Minister (born 1863)
29 September – Léon Bourgeois, politician, Prime Minister, awarded Nobel Peace Prize in 1920 (born 1851)
31 October – Max Linder, actor (born 1883)
11 November – Hugh Antoine d'Arcy, poet, writer and pioneer executive in the American motion picture industry (born 1843)
21 December – Jules Méline, statesman, Prime Minister (born 1838)
22 December – Joseph Ravaisou, landscape painter (born 1865)
26 December – Jules Patenotre des Noyers, diplomat (born 1845)
27 December – Marie-Louise Jaÿ, businesswoman (born 1838)

See also
 List of French films of 1925

References

1920s in France